John Lawrence "Ducky" Tillman (October 6, 1893 – April 17, 1964) was a Major League Baseball pitcher who played for the St. Louis Browns in .

External links
Baseball Reference.com

1893 births
1964 deaths
Sportspeople from Bridgeport, Connecticut
St. Louis Browns players
Major League Baseball pitchers
Baseball players from Connecticut
Minor league baseball managers
New Bedford Whalers (baseball) players
Memphis Chickasaws players
Houston Buffaloes players
Charleston Sea Gulls players
Hanover Raiders players
New Haven Weissmen players
Pittsfield Hillies players
New Haven Profs players
Albany Senators players
York White Roses players
Jersey City Skeeters players
Harrisburg Senators players
Wilkes-Barre Barons (baseball) players
Springfield Senators players
Manchester Indians players